Jesús Moraila Morales (12 September 1905 – 4 August 1983) was a Mexican sprinter who competed in the 1928 Summer Olympics and in the 1932 Summer Olympics. He was born in Culiacán, Sinaloa.

References

1905 births
1983 deaths
Mexican male sprinters
Sportspeople from Culiacán
Olympic athletes of Mexico
Athletes (track and field) at the 1928 Summer Olympics
Athletes (track and field) at the 1932 Summer Olympics
Competitors at the 1926 Central American and Caribbean Games
Competitors at the 1930 Central American and Caribbean Games
Central American and Caribbean Games gold medalists for Mexico
Central American and Caribbean Games medalists in athletics
20th-century Mexican people